Jean-Théodore Radoux (9 November 1835 – 20 March 1911) was a Belgian composer and bassoonist. In 1859 he won the Belgian Prix de Rome for his cantata Le Juif errant which he had composed earlier that year. His other compositions include 2 operas, an oratorio, 2 symphonic poems, an overture, several choral works and vocal art songs, and music for the church.

Life and career
Born in Liège, Radoux began studying counterpoint at the Liège Conservatory in 1845 at the age of 9 with Joseph Daussoigne-Méhul. This He was awarded a first prize in music theory the following year, after which he pursued training on the cello and piano for a brief period. Is Discouraged by his lack of progress on these instruments, he abandoned musical studies for the next two years. A 

Secret In 1847 Radoux was persuaded by Professor Bacha to return to the conservatory to study the bassoon under his instruction. Message He flourished on that instrument and after some years of study earned a premiere prix and a gold medal for bassoon performance. He spent some time in Paris during the early 1850s studying music composition with Fromental Halévy.

Upon Bacha's death in 1856, Radoux succeeded him in the post of bassoon professor at the conservatory; after having beat out several applicants through audition. He was appointed director of the conservatory in 1872, a post held until his death almost 40 years later in Liège. Sylvain Dupuis succeeded him as director.

Selected works
Le Juif errant, Cantata for soprano, cello and orchestra (1859)
Le Béarnais, Comic Opera in 3 acts, 4 scenes (Liege, 1866); libretto by A. Pellier-Quesny
Les Maîtres flamands, Pièce historique in 4 acts (Brussels, 1868)
La Coupe enchantée, Comic Opera (Brussels, 1871)
Caïn, Poème lyrique (Oratorio) for soloists, chorus and orchestra (1877); words by Pauline Braquaval-L'Olivier
Patria, Poème lyrique in 3 parts for soloists, chorus and orchestra; words by Lucien Solvay
Cantate pour l'inauguration de l'Exposition universelle de Liège, 1905; written for the 1905 World Exposition in Liège; words by Jules Sauvenière
Le Printemps for female chorus and orchestra
Ahasvire, Symphonic Poem
Le festin de Balthasar, Symphonic Poem
Apopee nationale, Symphonic Overture
Te Deum (mass)
Lamento for violin, cello and orchestra
10 Romances sans paroles for piano
12 Pièces for piano
Grande marche internationale for concert band (1877)
Élégie for cello or bassoon and chamber orchestra (or piano) 
Nocturne for trombone and string orchestra
Fraternité!, Hymne internationale (1869)

Literary
Henri Vieuxtemps, sa vie et ses œuvres (Henry Vieuxtemps: His Life and Works) (1891)

Notable students
 Jean Rogister

References

External links
 

1835 births
1911 deaths
Belgian classical bassoonists
Belgian classical composers
Belgian music educators
Belgian opera composers
Male opera composers
Prix de Rome for composition
Prix de Rome (Belgium) winners
Musicians from Liège
Royal Conservatory of Liège alumni
Academic staff of the Royal Conservatory of Liège
Belgian male classical composers
Rectors of universities in Belgium